Christopher Cornelius Culkin (born December 6, 1944) is an American stage actor and former manager. He is the father of actors Macaulay Culkin, Rory Culkin and Kieran Culkin, and the older brother of actress Bonnie Bedelia.

Early life
Culkin was born in Manhattan, New York City, the son of Philip Harley Culkin (1898–1977), who was in public relations, and Marian Ethel (née Wagner; 1914–1964), a writer and editor. He and his sisters Candice and actress Bonnie and his brother Terry were raised in New York City.

For middle school, Kit attended Saint Thomas Choir School in Midtown Manhattan. He and his sister Bonnie took classes at School of American Ballet (as did his son Macaulay in the late 1980s).

Career
Culkin's early career involved working on Broadway in theater productions with actors such as Richard Burton, John Gielgud, Laurence Olivier and Anthony Quinn.  His brother Terry and sisters Bonnie and Candace also worked in theater and television. Culkin credits his mother, who was their manager, for these early successes.

Three of his sons — Macaulay, Rory, and Kieran — are professional actors whose careers eclipse their father's acting career, but gained him prominence as their manager from the late 1980s to the mid-1990s. Macaulay became extremely popular due to his starring roles in the Home Alone films, and he was the first child in Hollywood to receive a million-dollar salary (for My Girl in 1991). From 1995 to 1997, Kit was part of a child custody trial.

Personal life
Culkin has eight children; his oldest, Jennifer Adamson (1970–2000), was with Adeena VanWagoner. His other children, Shane (b. 1976), Dakota (1979–2008), Macaulay (b. 1980), Kieran (b. 1982), Quinn (b. 1984), Christian (b. 1987), and Rory (b. 1989), were with Patricia Brentrup. Culkin and Brentrup were together for 21 years from 1974 to 1995, but never married.

Kit and Adeena's daughter, Jennifer Adamson, died in 2000 from a drug overdose. On December 9, 2008, Kit and Patricia's daughter Dakota was struck by a vehicle when she stepped off a curb into its path. She was taken to the Ronald Reagan UCLA Medical Center, where she died of her injuries the following afternoon, at the age of 29.

Culkin resided in Grants Pass, Oregon. After his long-time friend and partner Jeanette Krylowski died, on May 31, 2017, Culkin left his Grants Pass residence.

Filmography

References

External links

1944 births
American male stage actors
American people of German descent
American people of Irish descent
Living people
Male actors from New York City
People from Manhattan